The year 1989 is the 1st year in the history of Shooto, a mixed martial arts promotion based in the Japan. In 1989 Shooto held 3 events beginning with, Shooto: Shooto.

Events list

Shooto: Shooto
Shooto: Shooto was an event held on May 18, 1989, at Korakuen Hall in Tokyo, Japan.

Results

Shooto: Shooto
Shooto: Shooto was an event held on July 29, 1989, at The Yoyogi National Stadium Second Gymnasiu in Tokyo, Japan.

Results

Shooto: Shooto
Shooto: Shooto was an event held on October 19, 1989, at Korakuen Hall in Tokyo, Japan.

Results

See also
 Shooto
 List of Shooto champions
 List of Shooto Events

References

Shooto events
1989 in mixed martial arts